Pite may refer to:
 Piteå, town in Sweden known as Pite in local dialect 
Pite (food), Albanian foodstuff
Pite River, Swedish river
Pité (born 1994), Portuguese footballer

People with the surname
 Arthur Beresford Pite (1861–1934), British architect
 Crystal Pite (born 1970), Canadian dancer and choreographer
 Richard Pite (active from 1982), British musician and jazz historian
 Walter Pite (1876–1955), Australian cricketer